Dibley House, also known as Graf House, is a property in Fargo, North Dakota that was listed on the National Register of Historic Places in 1980.

History
It was built in 1906 in Classical Revival architecture style. It was constructed for  Francis E. Dibley (1860-1910) and his wife Ida Didley. Francis Dibley had been a representative of the Wisconsin Bridge and Iron Company. In 1898, Dibley and W.H. Robinson formed the bridge-building partnership of Dibley and Robinson, and actively began soliciting county bridge contracts throughout eastern North Dakota. In 1901, Robinson left the company, and Dibley reorganized the firm into the Fargo Bridge and Iron Company and served as president. In 1906, Dibley was elected as a member of the North Dakota House of Representatives.

References

Houses on the National Register of Historic Places in North Dakota
Houses in Fargo, North Dakota
Neoclassical architecture in North Dakota
Houses completed in 1906
National Register of Historic Places in Cass County, North Dakota
1906 establishments in North Dakota